Duroquinone is an organic oxidant (C6(CH3)4O2). It is related to 1,4-benzoquinone by replacement of four H centres with methyl (Me) groups.  The C10O2 core of this molecule is planar with two pairs of C=O and C=C bonds.

The compound is produced via nitration of durene (1,2,4,5-tetramethylbenzene) followed reduction to the diamine and then oxidation.

A derived organoiron compound (η2,η2-C6(CH3)4O2)Fe(CO)3 is obtained by the carbonylation of 2-butyne in the presence of iron pentacarbonyl.

The molecule has been mentioned in the popular press as a component of a "nano brain".

Duroquinone was observed in a degradation products generated from pyrolysis of α-Tocopheryl acetate.

References 

1,4-Benzoquinones